Convolutidae is a family of acoels. It contains more than a third of all known acoel species.

Description

The family Convolutidae includes acoels with a ventral mouth opening and a body-wall musculature composed both dorsally and ventrally by circular, longitudinal, and longitudinal crossover muscle fibers. The ventral body wall also has a group of U-shaped fibers. Most species are symbionts with algae. The anterior end has a cluster of frontal glands, a pair of eyes and a statocyst. The body has pigmented lens. Intestine and excretory system is absent. It is hermaphrodite but protandry is common.

Taxonomy

Genera
There are 25 genera in the family Convolutidae. The type genus is Convoluta.

 Achoerus Beklemischev, 1914
 Adenopea Antonius, 1968
 Amphiscolops Graff, 1904
 Antrosagittifera Hooge & Tyler, 2001
 Brachypea Antonius, 1968
 Conaperta Antonius, 1968
 Convoluta Ørsted, 1843
 Convolutriloba Hendelberg & Akesson, 1988
 Haplodiscus Weldon, 1888
 Heterochaerus Haswell, 1905
 Neochildia Bush, 1975
 Oligochoerus Beklemischev, 1963
 Oxyposthia Ivanov, 1952
 Pelophila Dörjes, 1968
 Philachoerus Dörjes, 1968
 Polychoerus Mark, 1892
 Praesagittifera Kostenko & Mamkaev, 1990
 Pseudanaperus Dörjes, 1968
 Pseudoconvoluta Beklemischev, 1929
 Sagittifera Kostenko & Mamkaev, 1990
 Stomatricha Hooge, 2003
 Symsagittifera Kostenko & Mamkaev, 1990
 Thalassoanaperus Hernandez, 2018
 Waminoa Winsor, 1990
 Wulguru Winsor, 1988

Species
There are over 100 species recognised in the family Convolutidae:
 Achoerus caspius Beklemischev, 1914
 Achoerus ferox Beklemischev, 1937
 Achoerus pachycaudatus Dörjes, 1968
 Adenopea cenata (Du Bois-Reymond Marcus, 1955)
 Adenopea chuni (Brauner, 1920)
 Adenopea illardata Löhner & Micoletzky, 1911
 Adenopea illardatus (Lohner & Micoletzky, 1911)
 Amphiscolops bermudensis Hyman 1939
 Amphiscolops castellonensis Steinböck, 1954
 Amphiscolops cinereus (Graff, 1874)
 Amphiscolops evelinae Marcus 1947
 Amphiscolops fuligineus Peebles 1913
 Amphiscolops gemelliporus Marcus 1954
 Amphiscolops gerundensis Steinböck, 1954
 Amphiscolops japonicus Kato 1947
 Amphiscolops marinelliensis Beltagi & Khafagi, 1984
 Amphiscolops mosaicus Kozloff 1998
 Amphiscolops potocani Achatz, 2008
 Amphiscolops trifurcatus (Beltagi 1983)
 Amphiscolops zeii Riedl 1956
 Antrosagittifera corallina Hooge & Tyler, 2001
 Brachypea kenoma Antonius 1968
 Conaperta antonii Achatz, Hooge & Tyler, 2007
 Conaperta cirrata Achatz, Hooge & Tyler, 2007
 Conaperta flavibacillum (Jensen, 1878)
 Conaperta lineata (Peebles, 1915)
 Convoluta albomaculata (Pereyaslawzewa, 1892)
 Convoluta baltica Meixner, 1938
 Convoluta bimaculata Graff, 1882
 Convoluta bohmigi (Brauner, 1920)
 Convoluta borealis Sabussow 1900
 Convoluta boyeri Bush 1984
 Convoluta chiridotae (Beklemischev, 1915)
 Convoluta confusa Graff 1904
 Convoluta convoluta (Abildgaard, 1806)
 Convoluta enelitta Antonius 1968
 Convoluta furugelmi Mamkaev, 1971
 Convoluta henseni Böhmig, 1895
 Convoluta hipparchia Pereyaslawzewa 1892
 Convoluta kikaiensis Yamasu 1982
 Convoluta krana Antonius, 1968
 Convoluta lacazii Graff 1891
 Convoluta lacrimosa Achatz, Hooge & Tyler, 2007
 Convoluta marginalis Ivanov 1952
 Convoluta maris-alba (Sabussow, 1899)
 Convoluta marisalbi Sabussov, 1900
 Convoluta naviculae Yamasu 1982
 Convoluta niphoni Achatz, 2008
 Convoluta pelagica Lohner & Micoletzky 1911
 Convoluta philippinensis Bush 1984
 Convoluta punctata Riedl, 1959
 Convoluta pygopora Antonius 1968
 Convoluta schmidti Czerniavsky, 1881
 Convoluta schuelii Achatz, 2008
 Convoluta semperi Graff, 1882
 Convoluta sordida Graff 1882
 Convoluta thela (Antonius, 1968)
 Convoluta uljanini Graff, 1904
 Convoluta variabilis (Pereyaslawzewa, 1892)
 Convolutriloba hastifera Winsor, 1990
 Convolutriloba longifissura Bartolomaeus & Balzer, 1997
 Convolutriloba macropyga Shannon & Achatz, 2007
 Convolutriloba retrogemma Hendelberg & Akesson, 1988
 Haplodiscus acuminatus Böhmig, 1895
 Haplodiscus bocki Dörjes 1970
 Haplodiscus incola (Leiper, 1902)
 Haplodiscus obtusus Böhmig, 1895
 Haplodiscus ovatus Böhmig, 1895
 Haplodiscus piger Weldon 1888
 Haplodiscus ussovi Sabussow, 1896
 Haplodiscus weldoni Böhmig, 1895
 Heterochaerus australis Haswell 1905
 Heterochaerus blumi (Achatz, Hooge & Tyler, 2007)
 Heterochaerus carvalhoi (Marcus, 1952)
 Heterochaerus langerhansi (Graff, 1882)
 Heterochaerus sargassi (Hyman 1939)
 Neochildia fusca Bush, 1975
 Oligochoerus bakuensis Beklemischev 1963
 Oligochoerus chlorella Beklemischev 1963
 Oligochoerus conops Beklemischev, 1963
 Oligochoerus erythrophthalmus Beklemischev 1963
 Oligochoerus limnophilus Ax & Doerjes 1966
 Oligochoerus melanops Beklemischev 1963
 Oligochoerus xanthella Beklemischev 1963
 Oxyposthia praedator Ivanov 1952
 Pelophila lutheri (Westblad, 1946)
 Philachoerus johanni Dörjes, 1968
 Praesagittifera gracilis (Yamasu, 1982)
 Praesagittifera naikaiensis (Yamasu, 1982)
 Praesagittifera shikoki Kostenko & Mamkaev 1990
 Sagittifera sagittifera (Ivanov, 1952)
 Stomatricha hochbergi Hooge, 2003
 Thalassoanaperus australis (Westblad, 1952)
 Thalassoanaperus biaculeatus (Boguta, 1970)
 Thalassoanaperus gardineri (Graff, 1911)
 Thalassoanaperus ornatus (Beltagi, 2001)
 Thalassoanaperus rubellus (Westblad, 1945)
 Thalassoanaperus singularis (Hooge & Smith, 2004)
 Thalassoanaperus sulcatus (Beklemischev, 1914)
 Thalassoanaperus tvaerminnensis (Luther, 1912)
 Waminoa brickneri Ogunlana, Hooge, Tekle, Benayahu, Barneah & Tyler, 2005
 Waminoa litus Winsor 1990
 Wulguru cuspidata Winsor 1988

Notes

References

Acoelomorphs